Deulpur (Bengali: দেউলপুর) is a census town in Panchla CD Block of Howrah Sadar subdivision in Howrah district in the state of West Bengal, India.

Geography 
Deuplur is located at

Demographics 
As per 2011 Census of India Beldubi had a total population of 12,618 of which 6,464 were males and 6,154 were females. Population below 6 years was 1,209.

Notable Personality
Achinta Sheuli, Indian weightlifter who won gold medal in Birmingham 2022 Commonwealth games.

References 

Howrah district